Meeran Trombley (born February 10, 1987 in South Korea) is an American retired competitive pair skater who has also competed for Canada.

Personal life 
Trombley was born in South Korea and was adopted as an infant. She was raised in the United States and eventually moved to Canada and skated with a succession of Canadian partners.

Career 
Trombley competed with Ian Moram on the novice and junior levels before teaming up with Jesse Sturdy in 2001. With Sturdy, she is the 2002 Canadian junior silver medalist. With Ryan Shollert, she competed for the first time at the senior level at the Canadian Championships and was ranked 10th in 2003. When that partnership ended following that season,  she teamed up with Jordan Frenette and competed with him twice on the Junior Grand Prix, for which was ranked 4th at the 2003 event in Zagreb and 6th at the 2004 event in Budapest. Trombley and Frenette trained at the Toronto Cricket Skating and Curling Club under Paul Wirtz.

On returning to the United States, she teamed up with Nathan Hess in 2005 and was ranked 15th on the junior level at the 2006 U.S. Championships. That partnership ended after the Nationals and she teamed up with Ibarra in March 2006. Trombley and Ibarra made their Grand Prix debut at the 2007 Skate America, they were placed 5th after coming in as last-minute alternates. Their partnership ended following the 2008-2009 season when both retired from competitive skating.

Programs

With Ibarra

With Frenette

Competitive highlights

With Ibarra

With Hess

With Frenette

With Moram

References

External links
 
 
 

1987 births
Living people
American adoptees
Canadian adoptees
American female pair skaters
Canadian female pair skaters
American people of South Korean descent
American sportspeople of Korean descent
Canadian people of South Korean descent
Canadian sportspeople of Korean descent